Eddowes may refer to:

 Catherine Eddowes (1842–1888), victim in the Whitechapel murders.
 Michael Eddowes (1903—1992), British lawyer.
 John Eddowes Bowman the Elder (1785–1841), British banker and naturalist.
 John Eddowes Bowman the Younger (1819–1854), English chemist.
 Steve Eddowes, chairman of the English Defence League.
 Eddowes Bowman (1810–1869), dissenting tutor.